Henri Niemegeerts (15 February 1922 – 19 September 2016) was a Belgian field hockey player. He competed in the men's tournament at the 1948 Summer Olympics.

References

External links
 

1922 births
2016 deaths
Belgian male field hockey players
Olympic field hockey players of Belgium
Field hockey players at the 1948 Summer Olympics
People from Etterbeek
Field hockey players from Brussels